The statue of Vitus is an outdoor sculpture by Ferdinand Brokoff, installed on the north side of the Charles Bridge in Prague, Czech Republic, depicting Saint Vitus.

External links

 

Christian sculptures
Monuments and memorials in Prague
Sculptures of men in Prague
Statues on the Charles Bridge